Eduardo Pedro Lombardo (born 13 March 1966), nicknamed Edú and Pitufo (Smurf), is a Uruguayan musician, composer, and singer. He stood out as a teenager as a member of several murgas in his country, in addition to accompanying renowned artists as a percussionist. Since 2007 he has developed a distinguished career as a soloist.

Career
At age 14, Lombardo was one of the founders of the El Firulete children's murga in 1980, the predecessor of what would become .

In the mid-1980s he began to study percussion.

In 1984 he joined , first as a percussionist and then as a director. With this murga he would earn the first prize of the Montevideo Carnival in 1988 and 1989.

In 1987 he was part of the last lineup of the group .

He has been a member of the accompanying bands of various artists, including Jaime Roos, Rubén Olivera, Mauricio Ubal, Jorge Galemire, and Jorge Drexler.

In 2002 the play Murga madre premiered, starring Pinocho Routin and Pitufo. The script was by Pinocho and the direction was by Fernando Toja. The show's music was composed by Pitufo. The show also gave rise to a DVD, recorded at the Solís Theatre. The title song of the play and the album is, in Edú's own opinion, the best that he ever composed.

In 2007 he began his solo career with the release of his first album, Rocanrol. With this he won the Graffiti Awards for Best Composer, Best Uruguayan Popular Music Solo Album, and Theme of the Year (for the song "Rocanrol").

In 2009 his first solo DVD was released, Rocanrol a dos orillas, recorded live in Montevideo and Buenos Aires.

In 2010 Pitufo returned to star in a play with Pinocho Routin, under the direction of Toja: Montevideo Amor. The soundtrack resulted in a new album.

In 2011, the DVD 30 años de música was released, which includes a show recorded at the Solís Theatre in 2010 (with Liliana Herrero, Fernando Cabrera, and Contrafarsa as guests) and interviews with relatives, acquaintances, and friends.

In 2012 Lombardo released his second solo studio album, Ilustrados y valientes. He was honored with the Graffiti Awards for Best Popular Music Album and Urban Song and Best Composer of the Year.

In Pitufo's solo career, he has accompanied a large number of notable artists in different shows, including Serrat, Lenine, Mercedes Sosa, and León Gieco.

In 2014 he launched the tour "Más Solo Que El Uno", which included concerts in Spain and Denmark, as well as various performances in his home country.

In 2014, the book Bien de al lado.

In 2017 Pitufo returned to compete at carnival with the murga Don Timoteo, together with his partner Marcel Keoroglián.

Discography

Solo albums
 Rocanrol (Montevideo Music Group, 2007)
 Ilustrados y valientes (Montevideo Music Group, 2012)
 Musicos Ambulantes (Montevideo Music Group, 2017)

DVDs
 Rocanrol a dos orillas (Montevideo Music Group, 2009)
 30 años de música (Montevideo Music Group, 2011)

Albums from theatrical plays (with Pinocho Routin)
 Murga madre (Montevideo Music Group, 2002)
 Montevideo Amor (Montevideo Music Group, 2010)

References

1966 births
Living people
Male singer-songwriters
Singers from Montevideo
Uruguayan composers
Male composers
20th-century Uruguayan male singers
21st-century Uruguayan male singers